Izapa Stela 5 is one of a number of large, carved stelae found in the ancient Mesoamerican site of Izapa, in the Soconusco region of Chiapas, Mexico along the present-day Guatemalan border.  These stelae date from roughly 300 BCE to 50 or 100 BCE, although some argue for dates as late as 250 CE.

Also known as the "Tree of Life" stone, it appears to illustrate a Mesoamerican creation myth.

The stela
Documented by Smithsonian archaeologist Matthew W. Stirling in 1941, Stela 5 is composed of volcanic andesite and weighs around one-and-a-half tons. Stela 5 presents the most complex imagery of all the stelae at Izapa. Researcher Garth Norman, for example, has counted "at least 12" human figures, a dozen animals, over 25 botanical or inanimate objects, and 9 stylized deity masks.

Like much of Izapan monumental sculpture, the subject matter of Stela 5 is considered mythological and religious in nature and is executed with a stylized opulence.  Given the multiple overlapping scenes, it appears to be a narrative.

Interpretation
Mesoamerican researchers identify the central image as a Mesoamerican world tree, connecting the sky above and the water or underworld below.

Linda Schele and Mary Ellen Miller further propose that the stela records a creation myth, with barely formed humans emerging from a hole drilled into the tree's left side.  The associated seated figures are completing these humans in various ways.  Julia Guernsey Kappelman, on the other hand, suggests the seated figures are Izapa elites conducting ritual activities in a "quasi-historical scene", which is framed by, and placed in the context of, the "symbolic landscape of creation".

Alternative interpretations
Based on parallels with traditions originating in the Old World, a few researchers have linked the stone to theories of pre-Columbian trans-oceanic contact. Mormon theorist M. Wells Jakeman proposed that the image was a representation of a tree of life vision found in the Book of Mormon. Jakeman's theory was popular for a time among Mormons, but found little support from Mormon apologists. Julia Guernsey wrote that Jakeman's research "belies an obvious religious agenda that ignored Izapa Stela 5's heritage".

Notes

References

, (1999); "The History of an Idea: The Scene on Stela 5 from Izapa, Mexico, as a Representation of Lehi's Vision of the Tree of Life", accessed June 2008.
, (1959) "The Symbol of the Tree of Life in Ancient America, and the New Tree-of-Life Carving Discovered at Izapa, Chiapas, Mexico," University Archaeological Society Newsletter 22 (1959): 4.
, (1999) " A New Artistic Rendering of Izapa Stela 5: A Step toward Improved Interpretation", Maxwell Institute, 1999. Pp. 22–33
 (2006) Ritual and Power in Stone: The Performance of Rulership in Mesoamerican Izapan Style Art, University of Texas Press, Austin, Texas, .
; Izapa (Precolumbian Art and Art History)", accessed December 2007.
; "The Izapa Ruins, A Photo Gallery", accessed December 2007.
 (1953) "An Unusual Tree-of-Life Sculpture from Ancient Central America," in Bulletin of the [Brigham Young] University Archaeological Society vol 4: 26–49
, (1952) An Archaeological Reconnaissance of the Xicalango Area of Western Campeche, Mexico. Bulletin of the University. Archaeological Society, no. 3. Brigham Young University, Provo.
 (1990) The Art and Architecture of Ancient America, 3rd Edition, Yale University Press, .
 (1982) "Izapa: An Introduction to the Ruins and Monuments", in Papers of the New World Archaeological Foundation 31: 110.
, (1973) Izapa Sculpture, Part 1: Album. Papers of the New World Archaeological Foundation 30. Brigham Young University, Provo.
 (2007) Olmec Archaeology and Early Mesoamerica, Cambridge University Press, .
 
, (1943) "Stone Monuments of Southern Mexico," Bureau of American Ethnology Bulletin 138.

External links
Picture and drawing of the stone
Stela 5 at the Archaeological Ruins of Izapa
The History of an Idea: The Scene on Stela 5 from Izapa, Mexico, as a Representation of Lehi's Vision of the Tree of Life 
  A New Artistic Rendering of Izapa Stela 5: A Step toward Improved Interpretation
Mormon article containing a drawing of Stela 5

Mesoamerican inscriptions
Buildings and structures in Chiapas
Mesoamerican stelae
Pre-Columbian trans-oceanic contact